The 1997–98 Croatian Ice Hockey League season was the seventh season of the Croatian Ice Hockey League, the top level of ice hockey in Croatia. Four teams participated in the league, and KHL Medveščak Zagreb won the championship.

Regular season

Playoffs

3rd place 
 KHL Zagreb – INA Sisak 2:0 (7:0, 11:2)

Final
 KHL Medveščak Zagreb – KHL Mladost Zagreb 3:1 (3:4, 3:2, 4:1, 7:5)

External links 
 Season on hockeyarchives.info

Croatian Ice Hockey League
1
Croatian Ice Hockey League seasons